Chrysocoris is a genus of brightly colored shield-backed bugs belonging to the family Scutelleridae, containing approximately 45 species.

Selected species
 Chrysocoris eques (Fabricius, 1794)
 Chrysocoris germari (Eschscholtz, 1822)
 Chrysocoris hypomelaenus (Vollenhoven, 1863)
 Chrysocoris iris (Germar, 1839)
 Chrysocoris marginellus (Westwood, 1837)
 Chrysocoris patricius (Fabricius, 1798)
 Chrysocoris pulchellus (Dallas, 1851)
 Chrysocoris purpureus (Westwood, 1837)
 Chrysocoris stockerus (Linnaeus, 1764)
 Chrysocoris stollii (Wolff, 1801)

References

Scutelleridae